Hakusan Station (白山駅) is the name of two train stations in Japan:

 Hakusan Station (Niigata)
 Hakusan Station (Tokyo)